Otholobium spissum is a dense, tangled, much branched shrub of up to  high that is assigned to the Pea family. It has dull green, clover-like leaves and white, pea-like flowers with a streaky, triangular, purple nectar guide. The species grows in renosterveld in the central mountains of the Western Cape province of South Africa. This species flowers in July and August.

Description 
Its greyish-brown branches are set with many white lenticels and are initially covered with white appressed soft hair.

The flowers occur in groups of three in the axil of the highest leaves of short new side shoots and each triplet is subtended by a small oblong bract that is quickly shed. The calyx has a purplish wash, is adorned with glands, more densely on the teeth and carries few short, black hairs, pressed to its surface. The tooth on the underside of the flower, next to the keel is somewhat wider than the other teeth, the two teeth on the upper side of the flower, next to the standard are not fused beyond the rim of the tube. As in most Faboideae, the corolla is zygomorphic, forms a specialized structure and consists of five free petals. The wings are longer than and enclose the two bottom petals, which are together called the keel. The two keel petals form a boat-like structure. About 1.5 mm under the tip, the pistil is widened and curves upwards, and at its very tip is a stigma with brush-like hairs.

Differences with related species 
Otholobium spissum differs from  O. candicans, which is an open spreading or upright shrub with willowy seasonal shoots (not a densely branched, compact shrub), that sheds last season's short shoots (not retaining them), has narrow leaves with very fine soft hair or hairless with hardly visible glands (not broader hairless leaves with clearly visible glands), flowers without bracts, a white silky hairy or hairless calyx, lilac petals (not small tufts of hairs subtending the small stumpy flowers, a sparsely black-haired calyx and white petals) and chestnut brown seeds (not khaki with brown blotches).

Taxonomy 
As far as known, a specimen of this species was first collected by the famous South African botanist Harry Bolus in 1907. Charles Stirton and A. Muthama Muasya considered it sufficiently different from its relatives, described it in 2017, and called it Otholobium spissum. The name of the genus Otholobium is a combination of the Greek words ὠθέω (ōthéō) meaning to push and λοβός (lobos) meaning pod, which Stirton selected because its fruit seems to be pushed out of the calyx. The species name spissum is derived from the Ancient Greek word σπιδνός (spidnós) meaning dense or solid.

Conservation, distribution and ecology 
Otholobium spissum is considered a vulnerable species that is known from seven locations. These populations are declining due to expanding vineyards and olive cultivation. It occurs in the Central mountain renosterveld on Bokkeveld and Witteberg shales at an altitude of about 600 m, in the Western Cape province of South Africa. It mostly grows individually but sometimes occurs in larger groups. This species dies in a fire and is therefore expected to produce many seeds.

References 

Otholobium spissum
Endemic flora of South Africa
Plants described in 2017